Patrick Reid Stewart, (Luugigyoo) is a Canadian-born Nisga’a architect, designer and educator based out of British Columbia. “Dr. Patrick Stewart, a citizen of the Nisga'a Nation in north-western British Columbia  has been operating his architectural practice in Sto:lo territory in Chilliwack, B.C. since 1997.” Stewart is the first Aboriginal person in British Columbia to own and operate an architectural firm and consequently his works have a First Nations community development focus. He heads the Provincial Indigenous Homelessness Committee in BC, as well as the Indigenous Task Force for the Royal Architectural Institute of Canada, and was the first Aboriginal president of an architectural association, the Architectural Institute of British Columbia. Stewart is also an adjunct professor of Architecture at Laurentian University for the McEwen School of Architecture in Sudbury, Ontario.

History 
Born in British Columbia, Stewart is part of the Nisga’a First Nation, and was “born homeless” as his mother was homeless at the time so was not allowed to take Patrick from the hospital. Stewart was in foster care from birth moved often growing up. Through high school, Stewart's home life began to affect his studies, and he began missing classes. From a young age Stewart knew that he wanted to be involved in the architecture field, but did not think it possible based on his family background. After graduating high school, Stewart attended multiple universities, graduating from five different programs and obtaining his Ph. D in 2015.  Stewart is now an accomplished architect with over 20 completed projects and has been the head of multiple committees and organizations, such as the National Aboriginal Housing Association and the president of the Architectural Institute of British Columbia. His firm, Patrick Stewart Architect, has been operating since 1995, being the first Indigenous person to own and operate an architectural practice in British Columbia.

Education 
Up until 1951 in Canada, Indigenous people had to give up their First Nations identity under the Indian Act if they wanted to enter high school or university or a professional field. In 1978, Stewart graduated from Simon Fraser University in the Bachelor of Arts program. He then went on to the Technical University of Nova Scotia, graduating from the Bachelors of Environmental Design Studies (B.E.D.S.) in 1980, and a Bachelors in Architecture (B.Arch.) in 1983. He then pursued his Masters in Architecture (M. Arch.) at McGill University in 1989. At the University of British Columbia, Stewart obtained his Ph. D. The repeal of the Indian Act allowed Stewart to become one of the first Indigenous architects in Canada to have graduated from university with his First Nations identity untouched. Stewart now continues in the education field as an adjunct professor at McEwen School of Architecture in Sudbury, Ontario, which prides itself on its cultural learning environment for the First Nations, Métis, and Inuit communities.

Approach to architecture 
Stewart’s architecture is focused on working with Indigenous communities. In his practice, Stewart incorporates Indigenous design principles and Indigenous knowledge. In 2015, Stewart issued his dissertation titled: Indigenous Architecture through Indigenous Knowledge - dim sagalts'apkw nisim (Together we will build a Village). “The purpose of this research was to find out how the culture of an Indigenous architect informs their practice of architecture. The research was based on an Indigenous methodology of respect, reciprocity, redistribution, relevance, reflection, relationship and responsibility. Conversations with nineteen Indigenous architects from Turtle Island, Australia, Cihuatan (El Salvador) and Aotearoa (New Zealand) were recorded, transcribed with content analyzed. They self-identified their culture and its influence on their design work.” Stewart was chosen as the architect for many Indigenous organizations projects due to his background as a Nisga’a designer. His personal architectural style has been developed through working with Indigenous elders, organizations and influenced by prominent First Nations architects in Canada, especially Douglas Cardinal.

Architectural works 
Stewart was selected as the architect to design the Dave Pranteau Aboriginal Children's Village in Vancouver. The building is a living space for Indigenous children and youth in care.

The Dave Pranteau Aboriginal Children’s Village, a foster care housing development in East Vancouver on Nanaimo Street and South Grandview Highway, and works in conjunction with the Youth Mentorship program to provide a stable environment for foster youths. The single units were designed to teach foster children how to live independently, while still providing support within the building. The building includes 24 apartments, from studio apartments to four bedroom dwellings, with commercial spaces on the ground floor. With an amenity kitchen for all the residents to use. The intent of the design was to emphasize a village.

The Sto:lo Resource Centre completed in 2010 offers a range of services such as archives, research, Treaty Outreach, Environmental Resource Management and others. “Built on the prior site of the Coqualeetza Residential School. Based on the traditional form of Qoqolaxel (the innovative inverted gable 'Watery-Eaves' longhouse at the junction of the Chilliwack & Fraser valleys), the Stó:lo People built a Siy:ám House; a place of respect, a place of culture, knowledge, economy, & sharing.” 

The Stó:lō Elders Lodge is an assisted living facility located in Chilliwack, BC. It is a ground level building with 15 assisted living suites for seniors and persons with disabilities. The Lodge adheres to the core principles of assisted living, such as choice, privacy, independence, individuality, dignity, and respect. 

The Gingolx Community Hall opened in October of 2012. The name of the hall was called: Wilp Han‚ Äôii Amgootkws Gitingolx, the Gingolx Memorial Recreation Centre. The hall has many amenities including; a large gym floor covered by a protective rug system to preserve the floor during community events. It has a sound system, and seating with bleachers for sporting and other events. It also has a kitchen that can be used for feasts.

Publishing 
"Indigenous Architecture through Indigenous Knowledge - dion sagalt'apkw nisim (Together we will build a Village)". His dissertation on Indigenous culture and how it informs Indigenous architecture, issued in 2015. 

Patrick is also the co-editor of Our Voices, Indigeneity in Architecture (2018). “The book begins as its title signals, calling to its reader in chapter-long verses that share research findings, practice observations, lived experiences and creative modes at the confluence of Indigeneity and architecture. Our voices is an extensive survey comprising 25 chapters contributed by Indigenous thinkers working as academics, activists, architects, artists, conservationists, designers, educators, policy analysts, urban planners and researchers invested in Indigenous architectures.” 

Patrick is also the author of the upcoming books, Complex Intimacies (2018) and I Heard my Grandfather Speak in the Longhouse (2019).

Awards 
Patrick Stewart is a LEED (Leadership in Energy and Environmental Design) certified architect. USGBC

Certificate of Practice, Architectural Institute of B.C. [PRSA]

Member (#2088), Architectural Institute of B.C. (MAIBC)

Finalist, Chilliwack Chamber of Commerce Design Excellence Awards

Social Sciences Research Grant, McGill University

References 

Living people
Year of birth missing (living people)
Wikipedia Student Program
Nisga'a people
21st-century Canadian architects
People from British Columbia
Academic staff of Laurentian University
Simon Fraser University alumni
Dalhousie University alumni
University of British Columbia alumni
McGill School of Architecture alumni
First Nations architects